Hugo Boss is a German luxury fashion house headquartered in Metzingen.

Hugo Boss may also refer to:

 Hugo Boss (fashion designer) (1885–1948), German fashion designer, businessman, and early Nazi Party member who established the Hugo Boss company.
 Joe Lycett (born 1988), British comedian who temporarily changed his name to Hugo Boss between February and April 2020 in protest against the company.
 Hugo Boss Prize, an art prize administered by the Guggenheim Foundation
 Hugo Boss Foursomes, a golfing pairs competition of the defunct Asian Matchplay Championship event

See also
 Boss (disambiguation)
 Boss (surname)